Israel Manoel da Silva Filho (born 9 July 1983), commonly known as Israel da Silva, is a Brazilian former footballer. He was the first Brazilian player to sign for Arsenal, when he joined them in 1999.

Career statistics

Club

Notes

References

External links
 

1983 births
Living people
Brazilian footballers
Brazilian expatriate footballers
Association football defenders
Arsenal F.C. players
CR Flamengo footballers
Valeriodoce Esporte Clube players
Ypiranga Futebol Clube players
Parnahyba Sport Club players
Campinense Clube players
Salgueiro Atlético Clube players
Auto Esporte Clube players
Lagarto Futebol Clube players
Brazilian expatriate sportspeople in England
Expatriate footballers in England
Footballers from São Paulo